Dunhill is a suburb within Johannesburg, South Africa. Dunhurst Estate, a residential complex, is the only development in the suburb. The complex was built in 2005. It borders the suburbs Fairmount, Glensan, and Sandringham.

References

Johannesburg Region E